Revel Films Pvt. Ltd. is an entertainment-based film production company. It was founded in 2009 by Ashok Pandey and Pragati Pandey. As part of its agenda, the company invests in and nurtures talent, ensuring that the films they churn out are sensible and entertaining.

Revel Films ventured into the entertainment sector with the short film ‘An Expression’ and the feature film 'Phas Gaye Re Obama'. Both projects have been immensely appreciated by audiences and critics alike.

About the founders
Ashok Pandey is the Founder of Revel Films. Having completed his education with BE (EEE) from BITS, Pilani and MS (Computer Science) from CCNY, New York, he is also the founder of US-based company IntelliGroup Inc. It’s with his extensive experience in the marketing and strategic side of business that Revel Films flourishes under.

Pragati Pandey is a B.Com graduate from Kanpur University with continuing education at PACE University, New York. Pragati Pandey is a trained actress, who has been part of and managed several events, shows, films, and plays. She is in the creative wing of the organization.

Films 
Phas Gaye Re Obama was Revel Films' first venture into the main market of Indian cinema. Directed by Subhash Kapoor and starring stalwarts like Neha Dhupia, Rajat Kapoor, Sanjay Mishra, Manu Rishi Chadda, Amole Gupte, this film was appreciated by audiences and critics alike. This debut mass venture was rated 4 stars on average by most reviewers. A satire on the lines of American inflation, and the ambitions of small-town thugs and a bandit queen, Phas Gaye Re Obama was a laughter-riot.
The industry gurus showered adulation on the film by awarding it in various categories.

Upcoming projects undertaken by Revel Films include ‘Saare Jahaan Se Mehnga’, a film by Anshul Sharma starring Sanjai Mishra, Zakir Hussain, Vishwa Mohan Badola, Sitaram Panchal, Pragati Pandey, Paritosh Sand, Ranjan Chhabra, Disha Pandey and Pramod Pathak. Saare Jahaan Se Mehnga is a satirical take on menghai.

References

 http://www.bollywoodhungama.com/movies/features/type/view/id/3329
 
 http://www.bollywoodhungama.com/moviemicro/cast/id/550545
 http://www.asianage.com/bollywood/small-films-big-hypocrisy-065
 http://www.rottentomatoes.com/m/phas_gaye_re_obama/
 http://www.rediff.com/movies/review/review-phas-gaye-re-obama/20101203.htm
 Hindustan Times
 
 http://timesofindia.indiatimes.com/entertainment/movie-reviews/hindi/Phas-Gaye-Re-Obama/movie-review/7028873.cms

Film production companies based in Mumbai
2009 establishments in Maharashtra
Indian companies established in 2009
Mass media companies established in 2009